Kunal Kapoor (born 26 June 1959) is an Indian actor, film producer, director and advertisement maker. He is a son of actors Shashi Kapoor and Jennifer Kendal, who made his debut with the 1972 English-language film Siddhartha, later acted in Shyam Benegal's Junoon and in his first mainstream Bollywood film, Ahista Ahista, opposite Padmini Kolhapure as well as  Vijeta. He also acted in the art films Utsav (1984) and Trikal (1985).

In 1987, he stopped acting after Trikal to set up his own company, Adfilm-Valas, to produce and direct television commercials. Adfilm Valas has also line-produced for many international feature films and ad films shot in India. Notably, the credit sequence of the film City of Joy, and the French films Le Cactus (2005) and Fire in Paradise.

In 2015, he returned to films after 30 years, appearing in Singh is Bling as Amy Jackson's father.

Personal life
Kunal Kapoor was born into the famous first family of Bollywood, the Kapoor family, the eldest child of Shashi Kapoor and his British theater-actress wife Jennifer Kapoor. His paternal grandfather, Prithviraj Kapoor, was a doyen of the theatre, a pioneer of the Indian film industry and the progenitor of the famous Kapoor family. His maternal grandfather, Geoffrey Kendal, was a British theatre personality. Kapoor's mother, Jennifer, died of cancer in 1984, while his father, Shashi Kapoor, died in December 2017.

Kapoor's siblings are Karan Kapoor (b. 18 January 1962) and Sanjana Thapar (b. 27 November 1967). Karan, a popular model who also worked in a few films in the 1980s, now runs a photography business in the UK. Sanjana Thapar runs the ancestral Prithvi Theatre and is married to Valmik Thapar, a noted conservationist. 

Kunal was married to filmmaker Ramesh Sippy's daughter Sheena, who is a well-known photographer. They had two children together, a son named Zahan Prithviraj Kapoor, and a daughter named Shaira Kapoor. Kunal and Sheena are now divorced.

Filmography

Actor

References

External links 

Indian male film actors
Indian people of English descent 
Living people
Male actors in Hindi cinema
Kunal
1959 births
Anglo-Indian people